Mirannulata is a genus of fungi in the class Sordariomycetes. The relationship of this taxon to other taxa within the class is unknown (incertae sedis).

References

Sordariomycetes genera
Sordariomycetes enigmatic taxa